SM Safi Mahmood is a Bangladesh Nationalist Party politician and a Jatiya Sangsad member representing the Brahmanbaria-1 constituency.

Career
Mahmood was elected to parliament from Brahmanbaria-1 as an Bangladesh Nationalist Party candidate on 15 February 1996.

References

Living people
Bangladesh Nationalist Party politicians
6th Jatiya Sangsad members
Date of birth missing (living people)
Place of birth missing (living people)
Year of birth missing (living people)